The Tall Texan is a 1953 American Western film directed by Elmo Williams and starring Lloyd Bridges, Lee J. Cobb, Marie Windsor and Luther Adler.

It was the only film directed by Elmo Williams, who said he had 50% of the profits but gave it away to attract the star cast. He said the film made a lot of money but he "never saw a dime".

Williams says he asked producer Robert L. Lippert for some extra money. "I thought we had a tag for a couple of thousand dollars", he said. "He said, 'I don't care if you have a beginning, a middle or an end- you're going to finish the picture now I'm calling back part of the crew.' And he did."

Plot
Sheriff Chanbourne (Samuel Herrick) transports convict Ben Trask (Lloyd Bridges) to El Paso in a covered wagon. The wagon also carries sea captain Theodore Bess (Lee J. Cobb) and married couple Laura (Marie Windsor) and Jerry Niblett (Dean Train). The group comes upon a wounded Native American, banished by his tribe, who agrees to lead them to gold. But then the tribe attacks the wagon, killing Jerry and wounding Chadbourne. Ben is freed to help, but the group's troubles have only begun.

Cast
 Lloyd Bridges as Ben Trask  
 Lee J. Cobb as Capt. Theodore Bess  
 Marie Windsor as Laura Thompson  
 Luther Adler as Joshua 'Josh' Tinnen  
 Syd Saylor as Carney  
 Samuel Herrick as Sheriff Chadborune  
 George Steele as Jaqui  
 Dean Train as Jerome 'Jerry' Niblett

References

Bibliography
 Henryk Hoffmann. Western Movie References in American Literature. McFarland, 2012.

External links
 

1953 films
1953 Western (genre) films
American Western (genre) films
Lippert Pictures films
American black-and-white films
1950s English-language films
1950s American films